Leucania cruegeri is a moth of the family Noctuidae. It is found in Western Australia.

Adults have brown streaky forewings and pale hindwings.

References

Leucania
Moths described in 1886